Manzanillo is a municipality in the Mexican state of Colima. 
The municipal seat lies at Manzanillo.

As of 2010, the municipality had a total population of 161,420.

Government

Municipal presidents

References

Municipalities of Colima
Revillagigedo Islands